The IBM System/360 architecture is the model independent architecture for the entire S/360 line of mainframe computers, including but not limited to the instruction set architecture. The elements of the architecture are documented in the IBM System/360 Principles of Operation and the IBM System/360 I/O Interface Channel to Control Unit Original Equipment Manufacturers' Information manuals.

Features

The System/360 architecture provides the following features:
 16 32-bit general-purpose registers
 4 64-bit floating-point registers
 64-bit processor status register (PSW), which includes a 24-bit instruction address
 24-bit (16 MB) byte-addressable memory space
 Big-endian byte/word order
 A standard instruction set, including fixed-point binary arithmetic and logical instructions, present on all System/360 models (except the Model 20, see below). 
 A commercial instruction set, adding decimal arithmetic instructions, is optional on some models, as is a scientific instruction set, which adds floating-point instructions. The universal instruction set includes all of the above plus the storage protection instructions and is standard for some models.
 The Model 44 provides a few unique instructions for data acquisition and real-time processing and is missing the storage-to-storage instructions. However, IBM offered a Commercial Instruction Set" feature that ran in bump storage and simulated the missing instructions.
 The Model 20 offers a stripped-down version of the standard instruction set, limited to eight general registers with halfword (16-bit) instructions only, plus the commercial instruction set, and unique instructions for input/output.
 The Model 67 includes some instructions to handle 32-bit addresses and "dynamic address translation", with additional privileged instructions to provide virtual memory.

Memory
Memory (storage) in System/360 is addressed in terms of 8-bit bytes. Various instructions operate on larger units called halfword (2 bytes), fullword (4 bytes), doubleword (8 bytes), quad word (16 bytes) and 2048 byte storage block, specifying the leftmost (lowest address) of the unit. Within a halfword, fullword, doubleword or quadword, low numbered bytes are more significant than high numbered bytes; this is sometimes referred to as big-endian. Many uses for these units require aligning them on the corresponding boundaries. Within this article the unqualified term word refers to a fullword.

The original architecture of System/360 provided for up to 224 = 16,777,216 bytes of memory. The later Model 67 extended the architecture to allow up to 232 = 4,294,967,296 bytes of virtual memory.

Addressing
System/360 uses truncated addressing similar to that of the UNIVAC III. That means that instructions do not contain complete addresses, but rather specify a base register and a positive offset from the addresses in the base registers. In the case of System/360 the base address is contained in one of 15 general registers. In some instructions, for example shifts, the same computations are performed for 32-bit quantities that are not addresses.

Data formats
The S/360 architecture defines formats for characters, integers, decimal integers and hexadecimal floating point numbers. Character and integer instructions are mandatory, but decimal and floating point instructions are part of the Decimal arithmetic and Floating-point arithmetic features.

 Characters are stored as 8-bit bytes.
 Integers are stored as two's complement binary halfword or fullword values.
 Packed decimal numbers are stored as 1 to 16 8-bit bytes containing an odd number of decimal digits followed by a 4-bit sign. Sign values of hexadecimal A, C, E, and F are positive and sign values of hexadecimal B and D are negative. Digit values of hexadecimal A-F and sign values of 0-9 are invalid, but the PACK and UNPK instructions do not test for validity.
 Zoned decimal numbers are stored as 1 to 16 8-bit bytes, each containing a zone in bits 0-3 and a digit in bits 4-7. The zone of the rightmost byte is interpreted as a sign.
 Floating point numbers are only stored as fullword or doubleword values on older models. On the 360/85 and 360/195 there are also extended precision floating point numbers stored as quadwords. For all three formats, bit 0 is a sign and bits 0-7 are a characteristic (exponent, biased by 64). Bits 8-31 (8-63) are a hexadecimal fraction. For extended precision, the low order doubleword has its own sign and characteristic, which are ignored on input and generated on output.

Instruction formats
Instructions in the S/360 are two, four or six bytes in length, with the opcode in byte 0. Instructions have one of the following formats:
 RR (two bytes). Generally byte 1 specifies two 4-bit register numbers, but in some cases, e.g., SVC, byte 1 is a single 8-bit immediate field.
 RS (four bytes). Byte 1 specifies two register numbers; bytes 2-3 specify a base and displacement.
 RX (four bytes). Bits 0-3 of byte 1 specify either a register number or a modifier; bits 4-7 of byte 1 specify the number of the general register to be used as an index; bytes 2-3 specify a base and displacement.
 SI (four bytes). Byte 1 specifies an immediate field; bytes 2-3 specify a base and displacement.
 SS (six bytes). Byte 1 specifies two 4-bit length fields or one 8-bit length field; bytes 2-3 and 4-5 each specify a base and displacement. The encoding of the length fields is length-1.

Instructions must be on a two-byte boundary in memory; hence the low-order bit of the instruction address is always 0.

Program Status Word (PSW)

The Program Status Word (PSW) contains a variety of controls for the currently operating program. The 64-bit PSW describes (among other things) the address of the current instruction being executed, condition code and interrupt masks. 

Load Program Status Word (LPSW) is a privileged instruction that loads the Program Status Word (PSW), including the program mode, protection key, and the address of the next instruction to be executed. LPSW is most often used to "return" from an interruption by loading the "old" PSW which is associated with the interruption class. Other privileged instructions (e.g., SSM, STNSM, STOSM, SPKA, etcetera) are available for manipulating subsets of the PSW without causing an interruption or loading a PSW; and one non-privileged instruction (SPM) is available for manipulating the program mask.

Interruption system
The architecture defines 5 classes of interruption. An interruption is a mechanism for automatically changing the program state; it is used for both synchronous and asynchronous events. 

There are two storage fields assigned to each class of interruption on the S/360; an old PSW double-word and a new PSW double-word. The processor stores the PSW, with an interruption code inserted, into the old PSW location and then loads the PSW from the new PSW location. This generally replaces the instruction address, thereby effecting a branch, and (optionally) sets and/or resets other fields within the PSW, thereby effecting a mode change.

The S/360 architecture defines a priority to each interruption class, but it is only relevant when two interruptions occur simultaneously; an interruption routine can be interrupted by any other enabled interruption, including another occurrence of the initial interruption. For this reason, it is normal practice to specify all of the mask bits, with the exception of machine-check mask bit, as 0 for the "first-level" interruption handlers. "Second-level" interruption handlers are generally designed for stacked interruptions (multiple occurrences of interruptions of the same interruption class).

Input/Output interruption
An I/O interruptionPoOps occurs at the completion of a channel program, after fetching a CCW with the PCI bit set and also for asynchronous events detected by the device, control unit or channel, e.g., completion of a mechanical movement. The system stores the device address into the interruption code and stores channel status into the CSW at location 64 ('40'X).

Program interruption
A Program interruption occurs when an instruction encounters one of 15 exceptions; however, if the Program Mask bit corresponding to an exception is 0 then there is no interruption for that exception. 
On 360/65, 360/67 and 360/85 the Protection Exception and Addressing Exception interruptions can be imprecise, in which case they store an Instruction Length Code of 0.
The Interruption code may be any of

 An operation exceptionPoOps is recognized when a program attempts to execute an instruction with an opcode that the computer does not implement. In particular, an operation exception is recognized when a program is written for an optional feature, e.g., floating point, that is not installed.
 A privileged operation exceptionPoOps is recognized when a program attempts to execute a privileged instruction when the problem state bit in the PSW is 1.
 An execute exceptionPoOps is recognized when the operand of an EXECUTE instruction (EX) is another EXECUTE instruction.
 A protection exceptionPoOps is recognized when a program attempts to store into a location whose storage protect key does not match the PSW key, or to fetch from a fetch protected location whose storage protect key does not match the PSW key.
 An addressing exceptionPoOps is recognized when a program attempts to access a storage location that is not currently available. This normally occurs with an address beyond the capacity of the machine, but it may also occur on machines that allow blocks of storage to be taken offline.
A specification exceptionPoOps is recognized when an instruction has a length or register field with values not permitted by the operation, or when it has an operand address that does not satisfy the alignment requirements of the opcode, e.g., a LH instruction with an odd operand address on a machine without the byte alignment feature.
 A data exceptionPoOps is recognized when a decimal instruction specifies invalid operands, e.g., invalid data, invalid overlap.
 A fixed-point overflow exceptionPoOps is recognized when significant bits are lost in a fixed point arithmetic or shift instruction, other than divide.
 A fixed-point divide exceptionPoOps is recognized when significant bits are lost in a fixed point divide or Convert to Binary instruction.
 A decimal overflow  exceptionPoOps is recognized when significant digits are lost in a decimal arithmetic instruction, other than divide.
 A decimal divide exceptionPoOps is recognized when significant bits are lost in a decimal divide instruction. The destination is not altered.
 An exponent overflow exceptionPoOps is recognized when the characteristic in a floating-point arithmetic operation exceeds 127 and the fraction is not zero.
 An exponent underflow exceptionPoOps is recognized when the characteristic in a floating-point arithmetic operation is negative and the fraction is not zero.
 A significance exceptionPoOps is recognized when the fraction in a floating-point add or subtract operation is zero.
 A floating-point divide exceptionPoOps is recognized when the fraction in the divisor of a floating-point divide operation is zero.

Supervisor Call interruption
A Supervisor Call interruptionPoOps occurs as the result of a Supervisor Call instruction; the system stores bits 8-15 of the SVC instruction as the Interruption Code.

External interruption
An ExternalPoOps interruption occurs as the result of certain asynchronous events. Bits 16-24 of the External Old PSW are set to 0 and one or more of bits 24-31 is set to 1

Machine Check interruption
A Machine Check interruptionPoOps occurs to report unusual conditions associated with the channel or CPU that cannot be reported by another class of interruption. The most important class of conditions causing a Machine Check is a hardware error such as a parity error found in registers or storage, but some models may use it to report less serious conditions. Both the interruption code and the data stored in the scanout area at '80'x (128 decimal) are model dependent.

Input/Output
This article describes I/O from the CPU perspective. It does not discuss the channel cable or connectors, but there is a summary elsewhere and details can be found in the IBM literature.

I/O is carried out by a conceptually separate processor called a channel. Channels have their own instruction set, and access memory independently of the program running on the CPU. On the smaller models (through 360/50) a single microcode engine runs both the CPU program and the channel program. On the larger models the channels are in separate cabinets and have their own interfaces to memory. A channel may contain multiple subchannels, each containing the status of an individual channel program. A subchannel associated with multiple devices that cannot concurrently have channel programs is referred to as shared; a subchannel representing a single device is referred to as unshared.

There are three types of channels on the S/360:

 A byte multiplexer channel is capable of executing multiple CCWs concurrently; it is normally used to attach slow devices such as card readers and telecommunications lines. A byte multiplexer channel could have a number of selector subchannels, each with only a single subchannel, which behave like low-speed selector channels.
 A selector channel has only a single subchannel, and hence is only capable of executing one channel command at a time. It is normally used to attach fast devices that are not capable of exploiting a block multiplexer channel to suspend the connection, such as magnetic tape drives.
 A block multiplexer channel is capable of concurrently running multiple channel programs, but only one at a time can be active. The control unit can request suspension at the end of a channel command and can later request resumption. This is intended for devices in which there is a mechanical delay after completion of data transfer, e.g., for seeks on moving-head DASD. The block multiplexer channel was a late addition to the System/360 architecture; early machines had only byte multiplexer channels and selector channels. The block multiplexer channel was an optional feature only on the models 85 and 195. The block multiplexor channel was also available on the later System/370 computers.

Conceptually peripheral equipment is attached to a S/360 through control units, which in turn are attached through channels. However, the architecture does not require that control units be physically distinct, and in practice they are sometimes integrated with the devices that they control. Similarly, the architecture does not require the channels to be physically distinct from the processor, and the smaller S/360 models (through 360/50) have integrated channels that steal cycles from the processor.

Peripheral devices are addressed with 16-bit addresses., referred to as cua or cuu; this article will use the term cuu. The high 8 bits identify a channel, numbered from 0 to 6, while the low 8 bits identify a device on that channel. A device may have multiple cuu addresses.

Control units are assigned an address "capture" range. For example, a CU might be assigned range 20-2F or 40-7F. The purpose of this is to assist with the connection and prioritization of multiple control units to a channel. For example, a channel might have three disk control units at 20-2F, 50-5F, and 80-8F. Not all of the captured addresses need to have an assigned physical device. Each control unit is also marked as High or Low priority on the channel.

Device selection progresses from the channel to each control unit in the order they are physically attached to their channel. At the end of the chain the selection process continues in reverse back towards the channel. If the selection returns to the channel then no control unit accepted the command and SIO returns Condition Code 3. Control units marked as High Priority check the outbound CUU to be within their range. If so, then the I/O was processed. If not, then the selection was passed to the next outbound CU. Control units marked as Low Priority check for inbound (returning) CUU to be within their range. If so, then the I/O is processed. If not, then the selection is passed to the next inbound CU (or the channel). The connection of three controls unit to a channel might be physically -A-B-C and, if all are marked as High then the priority would be ABC. If all are marked low then the priority would be CBA. If B was marked High and AC low then the order would be BCA. Extending this line of reasoning then the first of N controllers would be priority 1 (High) or 2N-1 (Low), the second priority 2 or 2N-2, the third priority 3 or 2N-3, etc. The last physically attached would always be priority N.

There are three storage fields reserved for I/O; a double word I/O old PSW, a doubleword I/O new PSW and a fullword Channel Address Word (CAW). Performing an I/O normally requires the following:
 initializing the CAW with the storage key and the address of the first CCW
 issuing a Start I/O (SIO) instruction that specifies the cuu for the operation
 waiting for an I/O interruption
 handling any unusual conditions indicated in the Channel Status Word (CSW)

A channel program consists of a sequence of Channel Control Words (CCWs) chained together (see below.) Normally the channel fetches CCWs from consecutive doublewords, but a control unit can direct the channel to skip a CCW and a Transfer In Channel (TIC) CCW can direct the channel to start fetching CCWs from a new location.

There are several defined ways for a channel command to complete. Some of these allow the channel to continue fetching CCWs, while others terminate the channel program. In general, if the CCW does not have the chain-command bit set and is not a TIC, then the channel will terminate the I/O operation and cause an I/O interruption when the command completes. Certain status bits from the control unit suppress chaining.

The most common ways for a command to complete are for the count to be exhausted when chain-data is not set and for the control unit to signal that no more data transfers should be made. If Suppress-Length-Indication (SLI) is not set and one of those occurs without the other, chaining is not allowed. The most common situations that suppress chaining are unit-exception and unit-check. However, the combination of unit-check and status-modifier does not suppress chaining; rather, it causes the channel to do a command retry, reprocessing the same CCW.

In addition to the interruption signal sent to the CPU when an I/O operation is complete, a channel can also send a Program-Controlled interruption (PCI) to the CPU while the channel program is running, without terminating the operation, and a delayed device-end interruption after the I/O completion interruption.

Channel status
These conditions are detected by the channel and indicated in the CSW.PoOps

 Program-controlled interruptionPoOps indicates that the channel has fetched a CCW with the PCI bit set. The channel continues processing; this interruption simply informs the CPU of the channel's progress. An example of the use of Program-controlled interruption is in the "Program Fetch" function of Contents Supervision, whereby the control program is notified that a Control/Relocation Record has been read. To ensure that this record has been completely read into main storage, a "disabled bit spin", one of the few which remains in the control program, is initiated. Satisfaction of the spin indicates that the Control/Relocation Record is completely in main storage and the immediately preceding Text Record may be relocated. After relocation, a NOP CCW is changed to a TIC and the channel program continues. In this way, an entire load module may be read and relocated while utilizing only one EXCP, and possibly only one revolution of the disk drive. PCI also has applications in teleprocessing access method buffer management.
 Incorrect lengthPoOps indicates that the data transfer for a command completed before the Count was exhausted. This indication is suppressed if the Suppress-Length-Indication bit in the CCW is set.
 Program checkPoOps indicates one of the following errors
 Nonzero bits where zeros are required
 An invalid data or CCW address
 The CAW or a TIC refers to a TIC
 Protection checkPoOps indicates that the protection key in the CAW is non-zero and does not match the storage protection key.
 Channel data checkPoOps indicates a parity error during a data transfer.
 Channel control checkPoOps indicates a channel malfunction other than Channel data check or Interface control check.
 Interface control checkPoOps indicates an invalid signal in the channel to control unit interface.
 Chaining checkPoOps indicates lost data during data chaining.

Unit status
These conditions are presented to the channel by the control unit or device.PoOps In some cases they are handled by the channel and in other cases they are indicated in the CSW. There is no distinction between conditions detected by the control unit and conditions detected by the device.

 AttentionPoOps indicates an unusual condition not associated with an ongoing channel program.  It often indicates some sort of operator action like requesting input, in which case the CPU would respond by issuing a read-type command, most often a sense command (04h) from which additional information could be deduced. Attention is a special condition, and requires specific operating system support, and for which the operating system has a special attention table with a necessarily limited number of entries.
 Status modifierPoOps (SM) indicates one of three unusual conditions
 A Test I/O instruction was issued to a device that does not support it.
 A Busy status refers to the control unit rather than to the device.
 A device has detected a condition that requires skipping a CCW. A CCW with a command for which Status Modifier is possible will normally specify command chaining, in which case the SM is processed by the channel and does not cause an interruption.

 A typical channel program where SM occurs is

     ...
     Search Id Equal
     TIC           *-8
     Read Data

 where the TIC causes the channel to refetch the search until the device indicates a successful search by raising SM.

 Control unit endPoOps indicates that a previous control unit busy status has been cleared.
 BusyPoOps indicates that a device (SM=0) or a control unit (SM=1) is busy.
 Channel endPoOps indicates that the device has completed the data transfer for a channel command. There may also be an Incorrect length indication if the Count field of the CCW is exhausted, depending on the value of the Suppress-Length-Indication bit.
 Device endPoOps indicates that the device has completed an operation and is ready to accept another. DE may be signalled concurrently with CE or may be delayed.
 Unit checkPoOps indicates that the device or control unit has detected an unusual conditions and that details may be obtained by issuing a Sense command.
 Unit exceptionPoOps indicates that the device has detected an unusual condition, e.g., end of file.

Channel Address Word
The fullword Channel Address Word (CAW) contains a 4-bit storage protection key and a 24-bit address of the channel program to be started.

Channel Command Word
A Channel Command Word is a doubleword containing the following:
 an 8-bit channel Command CodePoOps
 a 24-bit addressPoOps
 a 5-bit flag fieldPoOps
 an unsigned halfword Count fieldPoOps

CCW Command codes
The low order 2 or 4 bits determine the six types of operations that the channel performs;. The encoding is

The meaning of the high order six or four bits, the modifier bits, M in the table above, depends upon the type of I/O device attached, see e.g., DASD CKD CCWs. All eight bits are sent to and interpreted in the associated control unit (or its functional equivalent).

Control is used to cause a state change in a device or control unit, often associated with mechanical motion, e.g., rewind, seek.

Sense is used to read data describing the status of the device. The most important case is that when a command terminates with unit check, the specific cause can only be determined by doing a Sense and examining the data returned. A Sense command with the modifier bits all zero is always valid.

A noteworthy deviation from the architecture is that DASD use Sense command codes for Reserve and Release, instead of using Control.

CCW flags
The flags in a CCW affect how it executes and terminates.

Channel Status Word
The Channel Status Word (CSW) provides data associated with an I/O interruption.

 The Protection Key field contains the protect key from the CAW at the time that the I/O operation was initiated for I/O complete or PCI interruptions.PoOps
 The Command Address field contains the address+8 of the last CCW fetched for an I/O complete or PCI interruption. However, there are 9 exceptionsPoOps.
 The Status field contains one byte of Channel status bits, indicating conditions detected by the channelPoOps, and one byte of Unit status bits, indicating conditions detected by the I/O unitPoOps. There is no distinction between conditions detected by the control unit and conditions detected by the device.
 The Residual Count is a half word that gives the number of bytes in the area described by the CCW that have not been transferred to or from the channelPoOps. The difference between the count in the CCW and the residual count gives the number of bytes transferred.

I/O instructions

The S/360 has four I/O instructions: Start I/O (SIO), Test I/O (TIO), Halt I/O (HIO) and Test Channel (TCH). All four are privileged and thus will cause a privileged operation program interruption if used in problem state. The B1 (base) and D1 (displacement) fields are used to calculate the cuu (channel and device number); bits 8-15 of the instructions are unused and should be zero for compatibility with the S/370.

Start I/O (SIO)
SIO attempts to start the channel program pointed to by the CAW, using the storage protection key in the CAW.

Test I/O (TIO)
TIO  tests the status of a channel and device. It may also store a CSW, in which case it completes with condition code 1.

Halt I/O (HIO)
HIO attempt to terminate an active channel program. It may also store a CSW, in which case it completes with condition code 1.

Test Channel (TCH)
TCH tests the status of a channel. It does not affect the status of an active channel program and does not store a CSW,

Operator controls

The architecture of System/360 specified the existence of several common functions, but did not specify their means of implementation. This allowed IBM to use different physical means, e.g., dial, keyboard, pushbutton, roller, image or text on a CRT, for selecting the functions and values on different processors. Any reference to key or switch should be read as applying to, e.g., a light-pen selection, an equivalent keyboard sequence.

 System Reset sends a reset signal on every I/O channel and clears the processor state; all pending interruptions are cancelled. System Reset is not guaranteed to correct parity errors in general registers, floating point registers or storage. System Reset does not reset the state of shared I/O devices.
 Initial Program Load (IPL)PoOps is a process for loading a program when there isn't a loader available in storage, usually because the machine was just powered on or to load an alternative operating system. This process is sometimes known as Booting.

 As part of the IPL facility the operator has a means of specifying a 12-bit device address, typically with three dials as shown in the operator controls drawing. When the operator selects the Load function, the system performs a System Reset, sends a Read IPL channel command to the selected device in order to read 24 bytes into locations 0-23 and causes the channel to begin fetching CCWs at location 8; the effect is as if the channel had fetched a CCW with a length of 24, and address of 0 and the flags containing Command Chaining + Suppress Length Indication. At the completion of the operation, the system stores the I/O address in the halfword at location 2 and loads the PSW from location 0.

 Initial program loading is typically done from a tape, a card reader, or a disk drive. Generally, the operating system was loaded from a disk drive; IPL from tape or cards was used only for diagnostics or for installing an operating system on a new computer.
 Emergency pull switchPoOps (Emergency power off, EPO) sends an EPO signal to every I/O channel, then turns off power to the processor complex. Because EPO bypasses the normal sequencing of power down, damage can result, and the EPO control has a mechanical latch to ensure that a customer engineer inspects the equipment before attempting to power it back on.
 Power onPoOps powers up all components of the processor complex and performs a system reset.
 Power offPoOps initiates an orderly power-off sequence. Although the contents of storage are preserved, the associated storage keys may be lost.
 The Interrupt keyPoOps causes an external interruption with bit 25 set in the External Old PSW.
 The Wait lightPoOps indicates that the PSW has bit 14 (wait) set; the processor is temporarily halted but resumes operation when an interruption condition occurs.
 The Manual lightPoOps indicates that the CPU is in a stopped state.
 The System lightPoOps indicates that a meter is running, either due to CPU activity or due to I/O channel activity.
 The Test lightPoOps indicates that certain operator controls are active, when certain facilities, e.g., INSTRUCTION STEP, have been used by a Diagnose instruction or when abnormal thermal conditions exist. The details are model dependent.
 The Load lightPoOps is turned on by IPL and external start. It is turned off by loading the PSW from location 0 at the completion of the load process.
 The Load unitPoOps controls provide the rightmost 11 bits of the device from which to perform an IPL.
 The Load KeyPoOps starts the IPL sequence.
 The Prefix Select Key SwitchPoOps selects whether IPL will used the primary prefix or the alternative prefix.
 The System-Reset KeyPoOps initiates a System Reset.
 The Stop KeyPoOps puts the CPU in a stopped state; channel programs continue running and interruption conditions remain pending.
 The Rate SwitchPoOps determines the mode in which the processor fetches instructions. Two modes are defined by the architecture:
 PROCESS
 INSTRUCTION STEP
 The Start KeyPoOps initiates instruction fetching in accordance with the setting of the Rate Switch.
 The Storage-Select SwitchPoOps determines the type of resource accessed by the Store Key and Display Key. Three selections are defined by the architecture:
 Main storage
 General registers
 Floating-point registers
 The Address SwitchesPoOps specify the address or register number for the Store Key, Display Key and, on some models, the Set IC Key..
 The Data SwitchesPoOps specify the data for the Store Key and, on some models, the Set IC Key.
 The Store KeyPoOps stores the value in the Data Switches as specified by the Storage-Select Switch and the Address Switches.
 The Display KeyPoOps displays the value specified by the Storage-Select Switch and the Address Switches.
 The Set IC=PoOps sets the instruction address portion of the PSW from the Data Switches or the Address Switches, depending on the model.
 The Address-Compare SwitchesPoOps select the mode of comparison and what is compared. Stop on instruction address compare is present on all models, but stop on data address compare is only present on some models.
 The Alternate-Prefix LightPoOps is on when the prefix trigger is in the alternate state.

Optional features

Byte-aligned operands
On some models, e,g., the S/360-85, the alignment requirements for some problem-state instructions were relaxed. There is no mechanism to turn off this feature, and programs depending on receiving a program check type 6 (alignment) on those instructions must be modified.

Decimal arithmetic
The decimal arithmetic feature provides instructions that operate on packed decimal data. A packed decimal number has 1-31 decimal digits followed by a 4-bit sign. All of the decimal arithmetic instructions except PACK and UNPACK generate a Data exception if a digit is not in the range 0-9 or a sign is not in the range A-F.

Direct Control
The Direct ControlPoOps feature provides six external signal lines and an 8-bit data path to/from storage.

Floating-point arithmetic
The floating-point arithmetic feature provides 4 64-bit floating point registers and instructions to operate on 32 and 64 bit hexadecimal floating point numbers. The 360/85 and 360/195 also support 128 bit extended precision floating point numbers.

Interval timer
If the interval timer feature is installed, the processor decrements the word at location 80 ('50'X) at regular intervals; the architecture does not specify the interval but does require that value subtracted make it appear as though 1 were subtracted from bit 23 300 times per second. The smaller models decremented at the same frequency (50 Hz or 60 Hz) as the AC power supply, but larger models had a high resolution timer feature. The processor causes an External interruption when the timer goes to zero.

Multi-system operationMulti-system operation''PoOps is a set of features to support multi-processor systems, e.g., Direct Control, direct address relocation (prefixing).

Storage protection
If the storage protection feature is installed, then there is a 4-bit storage key associated with every 2,048-byte block of storage and that key is checked when storing into any address in that block by either a CPU or an I/O channel. A CPU or channel key of 0 disables the check; a nonzero CPU or channel key allows data to be stored only in a block with the matching key.

Storage Protection was used to prevent a defective application from writing over storage belonging to the operating system or another application. This permitted testing to be performed along with production. Because the key was only four bits in length, the maximum number of different applications that could be run simultaneously was 15.

An additional option available on some models was fetch protection. It allowed the operating system to specify that blocks were protected from fetching as well as from storing.

Deviations and extensions
The System/360 Model 20 is radically different and should not be considered to be a S/360.

The System/360 Model 44 is missing certain instructions, but a feature allowed the missing instructions to be simulated in hidden memory thus allowing the use of standard S/360 operating systems and applications.

Some models have features that extended the architecture, e.g., emulation instructions, paging, and some models make minor deviations from the architecture. Examples include:
 The multisystem feature on the S/360-65 which modifies the behavior of the direct control feature and of the Set System Mask (SSM) instruction.
 The System/360 Model 67-2 had similar, but incompatible, changes.

Some deviations served as prototypes for features of the S/370 architecture.

See also
 Memory protection key

Notes

ReferencesS360'''

Further reading
   Chapter 3 (pp. 41110) describes the System/360 architecture.

External links
 Introduction to IBM System/360 Architecture (Student Text)

Computing platforms
architecture
Computer architecture
Computer-related introductions in 1964